Trails of Danger is a 1930 American pre-Code Western film directed by Alan James and starring Hal Taliaferro.

Cast
 Hal Taliaferro as Bob Bartlett
 Virginia Brown Faire as Mary Martin
 Jack Perrin as Sheriff Johnson
 Buck Connors as John Martin
 Bobby Dunn as Deputy Shorty
 Pete Morrison as Deputy Tom Weld
 Joe Rickson as U.S. Marshall Bartlett 
 Frank Ellis as Butch Coleman
 Hank Bell as Hank

References

External links
 

1930 films
1930 Western (genre) films
American Western (genre) films
American black-and-white films
Films directed by Alan James
1930s English-language films
1930s American films